"Millionaire" is a song by American singer Kelis, featuring American rapper André 3000, taken from the former's third studio album, Tasty (2003). Released as the album's third single on October 18, 2004, the song was written by Kelis and André 3000, produced by the latter, and contains a sample of the 1985 song "La Di Da Di" by Doug E. Fresh and Slick Rick. Like Kelis' previous single "Trick Me", "Millionaire" was not released in the United States. 

The song peaked at number three on the UK Singles Chart, earning Kelis her third consecutive top-five single, while becoming a modest commercial success internationally. The accompanying music video, directed by Giuseppe Capotondi, does not feature Kelis or André 3000, but instead features children appearing as the duo's younger selves.

Commercial performance
"Millionaire" debuted at number three on the UK Singles Chart, becoming Kelis' third consecutive top-five entry from Tasty. The song performed moderately in the rest of Europe, reaching number eight in Ireland, number 11 in Finland, number 36 in Belgium, number 43 in Switzerland, and number 50 in Sweden. In Oceania, the single charted at number 23 in Australia and at number 27 in New Zealand.

Track listings

UK CD 1 and German CD single
"Millionaire" (radio edit) – 3:45
"Millionaire" (instrumental) – 3:45

UK CD 2 and Australian CD single
"Millionaire" (radio edit) – 3:45
"Millionaire" (instrumental) – 3:45
"Trick Me" (Tiefschwarz Special Trick Remix) – 7:33
"Millionaire" (video)
"Trick Me" (video)

UK 12-inch single
A1. "Millionaire" (radio edit) – 3:45
A2. "In Public" (featuring Nas) – 4:25
B1. "Trick Me" (E-Smoove House Trick) – 7:42

Credits and personnel
Credits adapted from the liner notes of Tasty.

Recording
 Recorded at Stankonia Recording and DARP Studios (Atlanta, Georgia)
 Mixed at Sony Music Studios (New York City)
 Mastered at Sterling Sound (New York City)

Personnel

 Kelis – vocals
 André 3000 – vocals, production, drums, music programming, keyboards
 Matthew Still – recording
 Vincent Alexander – recording
 James Majors – recording
 Carlton Lynn – recording
 Warren Bletcher – recording assistance
 Doug Harms – recording assistance
 Dexter Simmons – mixing
 Andrew Dawson – mixing assistance
 Kevin Kendricks – keyboards, piano
 Regina Davenport – production coordination
 Chris Athens – mastering

Charts

Weekly charts

Year-end charts

Certifications

Release history

References

2004 songs
2004 singles
André 3000 songs
Electronica songs
Kelis songs
Music videos directed by Giuseppe Capotondi
Songs written by André 3000
Songs written by Kelis
Songs written by Slick Rick
Virgin Records singles